Brumimicrobium is a Gram-negative and chemoheterotrophic bacterial genus from the family of Crocinitomicaceae.

References

Further reading
 
 
 

Sphingobacteriia
Bacteria genera